Sonali Gulati is an Indian American independent filmmaker, feminist, grass-roots activist, and educator.

Gulati grew up in New Delhi, India.  Her mother, a teacher and textile designer, raised her independently, She has made several films that have screened at over five hundred film festivals worldwide. Her films have screened at venues such as the Hirshhorn Museum, the Museum of Fine Arts in Boston, the National Museum of Women in the Arts, and at film festivals such as the Margaret Mead Film Festival, the Black Maria Film Festival, Slamdance Film Festival, and BlackStar Film Festival.

She has an MFA in Film & Media Arts from Temple University, and a BA in Critical Social Thought from Mount Holyoke College.

She is currently a professor at Virginia Commonwealth University's Department of Photography & Film.

Film
Sonali Gulati has made several short films and a feature-length documentary film.

Gulati's award-winning 2005 documentary film, Nalini by Day, Nancy by Night explores business process outsourcing in India. The film was broadcast on public television in the U.S., Canada, Europe, Australia, New Zealand, The Middle East, South Asia and North Africa.

Her film I AM has won 14 awards and continues to exhibit extensively. 
Gulati's award-winning documentary film I Am was broadcast on public television and cable TV in the U.S. and Portugal. Her documentary film Nalini by Day, Nancy by Night, was broadcast on television in the U.S., Canada, Europe, Australia, New Zealand, South Asia, and North Africa.

Awards
Gulati is a Guggenheim Fellow in Film. She has won awards, grants, and fellowships from the Third Wave Foundation, World Studio Foundation, the Robert Giard Memorial Fellowship, the Virginia Museum of Fine Arts Fellowship, the Theresa Pollak Prize for Excellence in the Arts, the Center for Asian American Media (CAAM), VCU School of the Arts Faculty Award of Excellence, grants from Creative Capital and was a Guggenheim Fellow in Film/Video in 2013.

Gulati is a Guggenheim Fellow in Film. She has won awards, grants, and fellowships from the Third Wave Foundation, World Studio Foundation, the Robert Giard Memorial Fellowship, the Virginia Museum of Fine Arts Fellowship, the Theresa Pollak Prize for Excellence in the Arts, the Center for Asian American Media (CAAM), VCU School of the Arts Faculty Award of Excellence, grants from Creative Capital and was a Guggenheim Fellow in Film/Video in 2013.

Her film I AM won several awards in the US and India:

 Gay/Lesbian festival prize (2011), Great Lakes Film Festival
 Special Jury Awards (2011), KASHISH Mumbai International Queer Film Festival
 Audience choice award for documentary feature (2011), Philadelphia Asian American Film Festival
 Grand Jury Prize, 10th Asian Film Festival, Dallas TX
 Grand Jury Prize: Best Documentary, Indian Film Festival of Los Angeles (IFFLA)

Filmography
Occupy (work in progress)
Bye Bye Lullaby (2023)
Miles & Kilometres (2021)
Big Time-my doodled diary (2015)
I Am (2011)
24 Frames per Day (2008)
Nalini by Day, Nancy by Night (2005)
Where is there Room? (2002)
Name I Call Myself (2001)
Barefeet (2000)
Sum Total (1999)

Writings

 "Place of Safe Landing" Queer Potli - Memories, Imaginations and Re-Imaginations of Urban Queer Spaces in India, ed. Pawan Dhall, QI Publishing, 2016
 "The Fight to Live", Outlook, Outlook Publishing Group, 2 July 2015
 "Welcome to Your Own Festival: Review on Nigah QueerFest’07." Biblio: A Review of Books, Vol. XII Nos. 5 & 6, June 2007
 "Confessions of a Desidyke: A Filmmaker’s Journey from Ignorance." Trikone Magazine, Vol. 20, No.4 March 2006
 "Sum Total." Because I Have a Voice, Queer Politics in India, ed. Arvind Narrain and Gautam Bhan, Yoda Press, 2005

References

External links

 

Mount Holyoke College alumni
Film directors from Delhi
Women artists from Delhi
Indian lesbian artists
Queer artists
1972 births
Living people
LGBT film directors
Indian women activists
20th-century Indian women artists
21st-century Indian women artists
Indian emigrants to the United States
American women writers of Indian descent
American film directors of Indian descent
American people of Punjabi descent
American documentary film directors
Indian women film producers
Hindi-language film directors
Indian women screenwriters
Indian documentary film directors
21st-century Indian film directors
American women documentary filmmakers
English film directors
Lesbian feminists
LGBT producers
American LGBT screenwriters
Feminist artists
American women artists of Indian descent
Artists from Virginia
Film directors from Virginia
21st-century American women artists
21st-century American women writers
21st-century American artists

20th-century Indian film directors
English-language film directors

Virginia Commonwealth University faculty
Temple University alumni

American women academics
Indian women film directors
Indian LGBT screenwriters
American lesbian writers